James Melbourne Durant III (born December 21, 1964) is an American lawyer and chief counsel for the Office of Science within the United States Department of Energy in Argonne, Illinois.

Early life and education 
A Southern California native, Durant was a student of the San Bernardino City Unified School District. His mother, Candy Mae Thompson, was a classified employee in the district. He was raised by his single mother, along with four siblings. In 1987, Durant earned a Bachelor of Science in political science from Howard University, majoring in pre-law with a minor in psychology. Durant elected to continue his education at Howard, graduating from the Howard University College of Law in 1990 with a Juris Doctor, with a concentration in international law and human rights.

Military service 
In July 2013, Durant retired as a colonel (O-6) from the United States Air Force after 26 distinguished years of service as a judge advocate in the Air Force Judge Advocate General's Corps (JAG Corps).

Some of his notable military assignments included director of legal services for the U.S. Air Forces in Europe – United Kingdom (USAFE-UK) from 2010 to 2013, deputy department head and professor of law at the United States Air Force Academy from 2008 to 2010, strategic initiatives officer for the United States Department of State in 2009, staff judge advocate at Hill Air Force Base, Utah from 2006 to 2008, deputy legal advisor to the NATO Headquarters in Sarajevo, Bosnia and Herzegovina from 2005 to 2006, and legal advisor to NATO Air South.

Legal career

American Bar Association
Durant serves on the board of directors for the Senior Executives Association (SEA) and is a former chairman the SEA's Membership Board. He has served as a delegate to the American Bar Association (ABA) House of Delegates representing the ABA Solo, Small Firm and General Practice Division since 2011. He is also a council member of the association's Government and Public Sector Division. He has received an association Presidential appointment every year since 1999 and is currently serving as a member of the association's Standing Committee on Disaster Preparedness.

From 2009 to 2010, Durant served as chair of the Solo, Small Firm and General Practice Division. From 2002 to 2004 he served as Chair of the Standing Committee on Armed Forces Law.

Durant is a fellow and past director of the Young Lawyers Division (2000–2002).

He also serves as a member of the Solo, Small Firm and General Practice Division with a term expiring in 2022.

Civil service
Since 2013 Durant has served as chief counsel, Senior Executive Service, of the U.S. Department of Energy, Office of Science, in Argonne, Illinois. The Argonne Site Office is an organization within the U.S. Department of Energy's Office of Science with responsibility to oversee and manage the Management and Operating contract for the Argonne National Laboratory (Argonne) in Lemont, Illinois.

References

Living people
American military lawyers
Howard University alumni
Howard University School of Law alumni
1964 births